Before Vanishing  is a French-language Syrian documentary film directed by Joude Gorani.

Synopsis 
The director of the film sets out for a journey from the beginning to the end of the Barada river and discovers a number of facts, like unplanned urbanization and pollution.

Production 
The documentary is directed by Joude Gorani as her graduation project.

References 

2005 films
2005 short documentary films
Films directed by Joude Gorani
Syrian documentary films
Documentary films about water and the environment
Student films